Amphilius crassus is a species of fish in the family Amphiliidae, first found in the Rufiji and Wami basin of eastern Tanzania.

References

crassus
Freshwater fish of Tanzania
Endemic fauna of Tanzania
Fish described in 2015